I'm a Celebrity...Get Me Out of Here! (occasionally shortened to I'm a Celebrity) is an Australian reality television series on Network 10 which is based on the British television show of the same name. The series aired mainly on Network 10 and 10 HD. The series sees celebrities living in the jungle with few creature comforts, and competing in various challenges to earn meals and other luxuries. The celebrities compete for $100,000 to be donated to their chosen charity. The series is set in Kruger National Park, South Africa, and is hosted by Julia Morris and Chris Brown.

On 16 July 2015 the series was renewed for a second season, which premiered on 31 January 2016. The second season was accompanied by the companion series I'm a Celebrity...Get Me Out of Here! Now! (similar to the original British series). It aired on Eleven (now 10 Peach) following each episode of the main series, hosted by comedian and former season one contestant Joel Creasey and The Bachelor Australia 3 contestant Heather Maltman. I'm a Celebrity...Get Me Out of Here! Now! did not air after the main show in later seasons due to low viewing rates. On 1 August 2016 the series was renewed for a third season with Morris and Brown returning as hosts, which premiered on 29 January 2017. A fourth season commenced on 28 January 2018 and concluded 12 March 2018.

A fifth season was announced and premiered on 13 January 2019. The show aired over a four-week period instead of the previous six week period. In addition to the normal show, an hour-long companion series called I'm A Celebrity: 'Saturday Schoolies aired on Saturdays at 7 pm, hosted by Scott Tweedie, and involved the celebrities completing different tasks and assignments in order to win the 'golden lunchbox'. On 7 February 2019, it was confirmed the show would return for a sixth season, which premiered on 5 January 2020.

In May 2020, Network 10 renewed the series for a seventh season and in August 2020 they confirmed that it would continue to air in 2021 despite the COVID-19 pandemic. However, it was unclear whether the series will be able to film in South Africa or change to another production location. In November 2020, it was confirmed the series will be filmed in Australia at a site near Murwillumbah, New South Wales (the site used for many international versions of the show), which premiered on 3 January 2021.

The series' eighth season was announced in August 2021 and premiered on 3 January 2022, whilst a ninth season was renewed in October 2022 and is set to premiere on 2 April 2023.

In February 2023, it was announced Brown had signed with Seven Network and would be leaving Network 10 in July 2023 after his final hosting duties of the 2023 season.

Format
The premise of the show is that there is a group of well known personalities living together in a specially constructed camp site in a jungle. During their time in the jungle they are isolated from the outside world and are not commonly aware of outside events. The contestants compete for $100,000 to be donated to a charity of their choosing, in addition to being personally reimbursed for their participation. While in the jungle, some of the contestants (generally voted by the viewing public) compete in challenges for food and luxuries for the camp. These challenges often involve local wildlife and are meant to take the contestants out of their comfort zone. Each week one or more of the contestants are evicted from the jungle, based on viewer votes. In addition, if the contestants become overwhelmed by their situation they can leave the series by speaking the phrase "I'm a celebrity...get me out of here!". However, it is reported that if contestants do quit they will have their income for participating in the series markedly reduced. Throughout the show, additional contestants (called "intruders") enter the competition; and beginning with season two, some contestants are only included temporarily (i.e. having a guest appearance). In the end, a final viewer vote occurs to determine the winner of the series, who is given the title of "King or Queen of the Jungle".

Bushtucker trials
The contestants take part in daily trials to earn food. These trials aim to test both physical and mental abilities. The winner is usually determined by the number of stars collected during the trial, with each star representing a meal earned by the winning contestant for their camp mates.

The Sunday Slam
In the fifth season, the celebrities participated in the Sunday Slam, in which every Sunday a celebrity had to complete a gigantic and hilarious obstacle course. These courses sometimes involved competing 'head-to-head' against another celebrity who was in the opposing team.  If the celebrity completed the course they would win a 'slam' of meals for their celebrities and if they didn't they would leave with very little food or nothing. The new tucker trial was split into two main parts - The Course and The Slammer. The time spent on the gauntlet determined how steep the Slammer would be. There were a number of challenges in the obstacle course, including a slippery slide, an 'electric forest', a spinning turntable, twin spinning logs, a 'mole hole', 'feathering' chambers and the 'boulder dash'.

Superhero Sundays
In Season 6 Superhero Sundays were introduced, which involved a group of celebrities participating in superhero themed trials each Sunday. These challenges include Dreadmill, The Scariest Trial We've Ever Done! and Buns of Steel.

Celebrity chest challenges
Any number of celebrities are chosen to take part in the celebrity chest challenge to win luxuries for camp. Each challenge involves completing a task to win a chest to take back to camp. However, to win the luxury item in the chest, the campmates must correctly answer a question. If they fail to answer correctly, the luxury item is forfeited and a joke prize is won. The luxury item is "donated" by a celebrity from the outside.

Secret mission
This is a challenge where some celebrities have to take part without alerting the other celebrities - if they are successful in their 'missions', they are rewarded.

Mystery box
A mystery box sees a box delivered to the campsite, each time containing a different gift for the contestants.

Immunity Challenges
In season 5 immunity challenges were introduced for the first time ever. These challenges were harder than the Bushtucker Trials and the celebrity that won the challenge couldn't be voted out of the jungle by the public.

Broadcast
The show is broadcast Sunday to Thursday at 7.30 pm, with a weekly eviction show on Sunday (except for the first week, where the celebrities arrive in the 'jungle'). All shows are presented by Julia Morris & Chris Brown from a nearby studio. The program is live to AEDT States (New South Wales, Victoria, Tasmania and the Australian Capital Territory), in other states the program is delayed to accommodate local time zones.

The fallout zone
In addition to the television broadcast, for the first season a live feed from the camp site aired for an hour after the AEDT airing of the show on Ten's website and mobile app, titled The Fallout Zone but more commonly referred to as FOZ. The content of feed was available on the website after the fact so viewers in other states could watch the show after their airing of the main show. The feed was hosted by comedian Sam Mac and producer Ciaran "The Butcher" Flannery, also known as "The C-Word".  On 8 and 12 March 2015, producer Dominic "The Domin8or" Sullivan filled in during Flannery's absence.  The duo interact with viewers through Twitter, using the hashtag #FOZ.  Mac and Flannery have no control over the shots used in the stream which has resulted in one episode featuring a 20-minute shot of a waterfall and, on 16 February 2015, a 15-minute conversation featuring a sound technician looking for Bob being picked up.  On 5 March 2015 the show famously featured audio problems during which Mac and Flannery's voices fluctuated between chipmunk and Darth Vader filters for the first thirty minutes. The show's theme song is Highway to the Fallout Zone sung by Sam Mac. The show did not return for the second season.

Saturday Schoolies
In addition to the main broadcast, season 5 had a companion show hosted by Scott Tweedie, which aired on Network Ten on Saturdays at 7:00 pm called I'm A Celebrity: 'Saturday Schoolies'''. 
The show involved all the celebrities in the jungle and was described as 'jungle detention'. Tweedie gave assignments, in the form of 'fun' games, to the celebrities which pushed them out of their comfort zones. The show was filmed on a classroom set in camp and the celebrities completed tasks to win the 'golden lunchbox', which included a number of school snacks such as an apple, dried mango, a muesli bar, biscuits, chips, chicken, a cheese & lettuce sandwich as well as juice.

Public voting
Throughout the show the public votes on who competes in the following tucker trial and whom to evict from the campsite. Viewers can either vote via SMS (by texting the name of the celebrity to 1995 1010) or vote via Social Media (namely Facebook or Twitter) by using the celebrity's hashtag (#celeb[name]). Voting via social media is limited to 20 votes per account. For tucker trial voting, viewers vote for celebrity they wish to compete. For eviction voting, viewers vote for a celebrity to stay. Voting closes at approximately 7:30pm AEDT for Sunday's eviction vote and at approximately 8pm AEDT for voting on other days.

Prior to the premiere of the second season, it was announced that the voting process would change slightly compared to the inaugural season. SMS voting was used for both trial and eviction voting while Twitter voting was used exclusively for trial voting. This change was implemented to even the playing field between celebrities with a larger international fan base (who are more likely to receive Twitter votes from said fan base) and celebrities with a smaller fan base who are only known in Australia. However, this decision was later reversed, allowing Twitter and Facebook votes for the finals.

Series overview
Winners crowned King or Queen of their respective year.

Key:
 King of the Jungle
 Queen of the Jungle

Series results
Key
 Winner – King or Queen of the Jungle
 Runner-up
 Third place
 Late arrival 
 Evicted
 Withdrawn

Season 1 (2015)

Season 2 (2016)

Season 3 (2017)

Season 4 (2018)

Season 5 (2019)

 Campers (Team Red)
 Caretakers (Team Blue)
 Intruder who entered after contestants were merged

Notes
 Throughout the series the contestants were given the opportunity, through challenges, to swap teams. On Day 6 the contestants played a game called 'Escape Fartists' which allowed Luke, Richard and Angie to move onto the Red team, in exchange for Jacqui, Sam and Yvie's positions. Consequently, placing them these three celebrities on the Blue team.
 The Grand Final was recorded on Wednesday 13 February (Day 33), but due to scheduling Channel 10 aired the episodes on the following Sunday 17 February.
 When Lambie appeared in the show in 2019, she was not serving as a Senator. In the 2019 Federal Election, Lambie was re-elected to the Senate.

Season 6 (2020)

The sixth season was renewed on 7 February 2019 and returned on 5 January 2020.

Season 7 (2021)

The seventh season was renewed on 11 May 2020 and premiered on 3 January 2021. It was the first series to be filmed in Australia and was pre-recorded due to the COVID-19 pandemic. In a format change (given the pre-recorded production), the celebrities were eliminated in Elimination Trials, with the winner still being determined by public vote between the final seven contestants.

 Team Red
 Team Blue
 Team Green
 Intruder who entered after contestants were merged

Season 8 (2022)

The eighth season was renewed in August 2021 and premiered on 3 January 2022.

 Team Red
 Team Blue

Ratings

Awards and nominations

Lawsuit
In June 2017, Tom Arnold filed a lawsuit against Network Ten and A List Entertainment for defrauding him for being on I'm a Celebrity...Get Me Out of Here!. Arnold claims that he was promised a payment of $425,000 and a comedy tour in Australia, however he was missing $140,000 in payment and that Network Ten backed out of the comedy tour.

See alsoAustralian SurvivorCelebrity Big Brother AustraliaI'm a Celebrity...Get Me Out of Here! franchiseI'm a Celebrity...Get Me Out of Here! (British TV series)''

References

External links

Production website

 
Network 10 original programming
2015 Australian television series debuts
2010s Australian reality television series
English-language television shows
Television series by ITV Studios
Television shows set in South Africa
Australian television series based on British television series
2020s Australian reality television series